John William Bashley Collins (born 10 August 1942) is an English former footballer who scored 108 goals from 417 appearances in the Football League in the 1960s and early 1970s, playing as an inside left for Queens Park Rangers, Oldham Athletic, Reading, Luton Town and Cambridge United.

Collins came through the youth ranks at Queens Park Rangers, turned professional in 1959 and made his debut in a 1–0 win against Barnsley in April 1960. He went on to play 172 league games for Rangers, scoring 46 league goals, then transferred to Oldham Athletic in 1966 and later had spells at Reading, Luton Town and Cambridge United.

Collins became a cult hero at QPR after famously scoring a hat-trick of headers in a game versus Hull City. Collins also scored a fourth, although this was discounted by match official Cedric Tomlinson.

Ken Wagstaff of Hull later described the performance as: "A hatrick of headers - that's certainly something I'd never be able to do."

References

1942 births
Living people
Footballers from Chiswick
English footballers
Association football inside forwards
Queens Park Rangers F.C. players
Oldham Athletic A.F.C. players
Reading F.C. players
Luton Town F.C. players
Cambridge United F.C. players
English Football League players